American singer-songwriter and musician Christina Perri has released four studio albums, three extended plays, eleven singles, seven promotional singles, and thirteen music videos.

Perri's debut single, "Jar of Hearts", was released independently in June 2010 and charted in North America following exposure on So You Think You Can Dance. She then signed with Atlantic Records in July 2010 and released her debut studio album, Lovestrong in May 2011. Subsequent singles, "Arms" and "Distance", failed to replicate their predecessor's mainstream success, but did both chart in the top twenty of the Billboard Adult Pop Songs chart. In 2011, Perri contributed the single "A Thousand Years" to the soundtrack album to the hit film, The Twilight Saga: Breaking Dawn – Part 1; the song charted well internationally and domestically, and being certified Diamond by RIAA.

Head or Heart was released in March 2014 as Perri's second studio album. Its lead single, "Human", was a moderate hit, reaching the top 40 of the Billboard Hot 100 and being certified 3× Platinum by RIAA. Follow-up singles, "Burning Gold" and "The Words" failed to the enter the Hot 100 and only charted in the 20s on the Adult Pop chart.

Studio albums

Extended plays

Singles

As lead artist

Promotional singles

Other appearances

Music videos

Notes

References

Pop music discographies
Discographies of American artists